Birthday Candles is a play by Noah Haidle. It was originally scheduled to open on April 2, 2020, but was delayed by the COVID-19 pandemic. It subsequently ran at the American Airlines Theatre from March 18 to May 29, 2022, starring Debra Messing as Ernestine Ashworth and directed by Messing's Tisch School of the Arts classmate Vivienne Benesch.

In the play, Ashworth recreates the same birthday cake each year as she ages from 17 to 101 without any external signs of aging, and Messing is on stage for the entire show. Birthday Candles was commissioned by Detroit Public Theatre in fall 2016, and Benesch oversaw a workshop during her tenure as artistic director of the Chautauqua Theater Company. Benesch directed a Chautauqua production in 2017 before it made its debut in Detroit in 2018.

References

External links

2017 plays
Broadway plays